Conviction: Thoughts of Bill Evans is the 8th album by jazz singer Roseanna Vitro, released in 2001 by A Records, an imprint of Challenge Records International.

Reception
AllMusic awarded the album 4½ stars out of five, with reviewer Alex Henderson calling it "a consistently interesting date" fueled by a host of supporting players well versed in Evans' music, and by Vitro's uniquely personal take on a variety of Evans themes and belatedly added lyrics.

Track listing
All music composed by Bill Evans except where indicated.
 "My Bells" (Bill Evans, Gene Lees) - 4:32
 "Remembering the Rain" (Evans, Carol Hall) - 4:13
 "Two Lonely People" [sic] (Evans, Carol Hall) - 4:20
 "Prelude to a Funk" (Roseanna Vitro, Paul Wickliffe) - 0:22
 "Funkallero" (Evans, Vítor Martins, Alan and Marilyn Bergman)  - 3:00
 "Only Child" (Evans, Roger Schore) - 5:14
 "Conviction" (Vitro) - 3:33                                          
 "Turn Out the Stars" (Evans, Lees) - 4:28
 "Waltz for Debby" (Evans, Lees) - 4:40
 "In April" (Evans, Roger Schore) - 4:23
 "Very Early" (Evans, Carol Hall) - 5:40
 "Letter to Evan" (Evans) - 4:25

Personnel
Vocals – Roseanna Vitro – vocals
Piano – Fred Hersch, Mark Soskin, Allen Farnham
Bass – Eddie Gomez, Scott Lee, Bob Bowen
Drums – Adrian D'Souza

References

2001 albums
Roseanna Vitro albums
Bill Evans tribute albums